Lamprophis is a genus of medium-sized, nonvenomous snakes commonly referred to as African house snakes, in the family Lamprophiidae.

Description
Species of Lamprophis exhibit a wide variety of pattern variation, and may be spotted, striped, or solid in color. Albino variants of Lamprophis aurora have been found.

Species
As of 2022, 3 species in the genus Lamprophis are recognized:

Lamprophis aurora  – aurora house snake
Lamprophis fiskii  – Fisk's house snake, vulnerable (VU)
Lamprophis fuscus  – yellow-bellied house snake, near threatened (LR/nt)

Nota bene: A binomial authority in parentheses indicates that the species was originally described in a genus other than Lamprophis.

The species formerly known as Lamprophis capensis, the brown house snake or Cape house snake, has been assigned to the genus Boaedon, as Boaedon capensis.

The species formerly known as Lamprophis erlangeri, the Ethiopian house snake, has been assigned to the genus Bofa as Bofa erlangeri.

Geographic range
House snakes are found throughout all of sub-Saharan Africa in a wide variety of habitats; some species are well adapted to living in burrows. They are named "house" snakes as they are frequently found around human dwellings, feeding on the rodents that congregate around human waste. They are extremely adaptable snakes, which are found in scrubland, woodland, savannah, and montane regions.

Behaviour and diet
Wild house snakes are often very nervous, but are not prone to biting. Their first defensive reaction is to flee. They are frequently found in and around human dwellings, where they consume rodents, small lizards, and even birds. House snakes are prolific breeders and lay clutches averaging eight to 12 eggs that hatch after around two months of incubation. Hatchlings are typically around 20 cm long.

In captivity
African house snakes are common in the exotic pet trade. The primary species available is B. capensis, with the others being harder to acquire. They are easy to care for and breed readily. 
They can live up to 20 years with proper care. These snakes are nocturnal. The female lays one clutch of 9 to 16 eggs in early spring. They are known to store sperm and can lay up to six clutches per year in captivity, but it rarely happens in nature. Hatchlings are  upon hatching.

Diet
Their main diet consists of rodents; in captivity, smaller snakes take pinkie mice, and in the wild they more commonly prey on geckos until they are powerful enough to constrict mice. Large females are known to occasionally eat weanling rats. Adult snakes get fed weekly. Hatchlings may eat small lizards, such as skinks and geckos, and newborn mice. In captivity, they can successfully be fed on gecko tails. Larger specimens are also known to take lizards, and in rare cases they will catch small bats.  House snakes should be fed alone; their often violent feeding response may cause cannibalism.

References

External links
 
 The African house snake page On Kingsnake.com
 Lamprophis website
 African house snakes
 House snake photographs
 Lamprophis forums
 House snake captive care guide
 Informational Lamprophis website and forum

Further reading
Boulenger GA (1893). Catalogue of the Snakes in the British Museum (Natural History). Volume I., Containing the Families ... Colubridæ Aglyphæ, part. London: Trustees of the British Museum (Natural History). (Taylor and Francis, printers). xiii + 448 pp. + Plates I-XXVIII. (Genus Lamprophis, p. 39, Figure 19).
Branch, Bill (2004). Field Guide to Snakes and Other Reptiles of Southern Africa. Third Revised edition, Second impression. Sanibel Island, Florida: Ralph Curtis Books. 399 pp. . (Genus Lamprophis [sensu lato], pp. 73–74).
Fitzinger L (1843). Systema Reptilium, Fasciculus Primus, Amblyglossae. Vienna: Braumüller & Seidel. 106 pp. + indices. (Lamprophis, new genus, p. 25). (in Latin).
FitzSimons V (1966). "A check-list, with synoptic keys, to the snakes of Southern Africa". Annals of the Transvaal Museum 25 (3): 35-79. (Genus Lamprophis, Key to the species, p. 45).

 
Lamprophiidae
Taxa named by Leopold Fitzinger
Snake genera